National Museum Cardiff is a museum and art gallery in Cardiff, Wales. The museum is part of the wider network of Amgueddfa Cymru – National Museum Wales. Entry is kept free by a grant from the Welsh Government; however, they do ask for donations throughout the museum.

History
The National Museum of Wales was founded in 1905, with its royal charter granted in 1907. Part of the bid for Cardiff to obtain the National Museum for Wales included the gift of the Cardiff Museum Collection, then known as "Welsh Museum of Natural History, Archaeology and Art," which was formally handed over in 1912. The Cardiff Museum was sharing the building of Cardiff Library, and was a sub-department of the library until 1893. Construction of a new building in the civic complex of Cathays Park began in 1912, but owing to the First World War it did not open to the public until 1922, with the official opening taking place in 1927. The architects were Arnold Dunbar Smith and Cecil Brewer, although the building as it now stands is a heavily truncated version of their design.

The sculpture scheme for the building was devised by Sir W. Goscombe John and consisted of the groups Prehistoric Period and Classic Period by Gilbert Bayes as well as Learning, Mining, and Shipping by Thomas J Clapperton, Art by Bertram Pegram, Medieval Period by Richard Garbe, Music by David Evans, and others. D. Arthur Thomas was commissioned to produce a model for the dragons, and A. Bertram Pegram to produce a model for the lions that were placed around the base of the dome.

Present
The museum has collections of botany, fine and applied art, geology, and zoology. Archaeology has been moved to the St Fagans National Museum of History.

In 2011, with funding from the Clore Duffield Foundation, the former Glanely Gallery was transformed into the Clore Discovery Centre, which offers hands-on exploration of the museum's 7.5 million items that are normally in storage, including insects, fossils and Bronze Age weapons. School groups, formal and informal groups can also be accommodated but should book in advance.

National Museum of Art

The National Museum of Art opened in 2011. The collection of Old Master paintings in Cardiff includes, among other notable works, The Virgin and Child between Saint Helena and St Francis by Amico Aspertini, The Poulterer's Shop by Frans Snyders, A Calm by Jan van de Cappelle Since 2016, the museum has had Rembrandt's 1657 Portrait of Catharina Hooghsaet on permanent display. In 2019, a painting depicting the Madonna and Child with a Pomegranate, which was thought to be a late copy by a lesser artist of a lost work by Sandro Botticelli featured on the television programme Britain's Lost Masterpieces where, after conservation treatment by Simon Gillespie and research by Bendor Grosvenor, it was confirmed to be from the studio of Botticelli, with parts by the master himself.

A collection of landscape paintings in the classical tradition includes works by Claude, Gaspard Dughet, Salvator Rosa and two works by Nicolas Poussin: The Funeral of Phocion (1648) and The Finding of Moses (the latter owned jointly by the Museum and the National Gallery, London). These works prefigure the career of the Welsh-born Richard Wilson, called "the father of British landscape painting". In 1979 four cartoons for tapestries illustrating scenes from the Aeneid were bought as works by Peter Paul Rubens, but the attribution is now disputed.

There is a gallery devoted to British patronage of the 18th century, in particular that of Sir Watkin Williams Wynn, who was nicknamed 'the Welsh Medici' for his lavish spending on the arts. Included is a portrait of Williams-Wynn in Rome with fellow Tourists by Pompeo Batoni, one of his second wife by Sir Joshua Reynolds and his chamber organ designed by Robert Adam. Other paintings of note from this period is a portrait of Viscountess Elizabeth Bulkeley of Beaumaris as the mythological character Hebe, by the 'sublime and terrible' George Romney, and Johann Zoffany's group portrait of Henry Knight, a Glamorgan landowner, with his children.

The collection of French art assembled by Margaret and Gwendoline Davies, granddaughters of the wealthy industrialist David Davies bequeathed to the National Museum in the 1950s and 1960s, make Wales's National Gallery one of international standing. It includes the largest group of paintings by Honoré Daumier in the world and the most important by Jean-François Millet in Britain. Works by Claude Monet include Venetian scenes such as San Giorgio Maggiore at Dusk and examples from his Rouen Cathedral and Water Lilies series. Post-impressionism is represented by Van Gogh's late work Rain at Auvers, and by Paul Cézanne's The François Zola Dam, the first painting by the artist to be displayed in a British public collection. The two most famous works in the Davies Sisters' collection are La Parisienne by Pierre-Auguste Renoir (1874), exhibited in the First Impressionist Exhibition, and a version of Rodin's Kiss cast in bronze.

The art gallery has works by all of the notable Welsh artists, including landscapes by Richard Wilson and the pioneering Thomas Jones. There is a considerable body of work by John Gibson, Queen Victoria's favourite sculptor, and major paintings by Augustus John and his sister Gwen John, including the former's famous image of Dylan Thomas. Ceri Richards is well represented. The artistic output of David Jones is well represented, but seldom on display owing to the fragile nature of his works on paper. Wales's most prominent contemporary painter, Sir Kyffin Williams (1918–2006), also features in the collection.

The collection of 20th-century art includes works by sculptors Jacob Epstein, Herbert Ward and Eric Gill and painters including Stanley Spencer, the British Impressionist Wynford Dewhurst, L. S. Lowry, and Oskar Kokoschka. Works by contemporary artists are on rotational display, including those by Luke Jones, Francis Bacon, Frank Auerbach and Rachel Whiteread. Pablo Picasso's Nature Morte au Poron was acquired in 2009.

Black lives matter
In the wake of the removal of the Statue of Edward Colston in Bristol on 6 June 2020, Wales Online reported that there was a campaign to remove monuments to Welsh war hero Sir Thomas Picton in Carmarthen and Cardiff. 
In November 2021, the museum removed a 19th-century portrait of Sir Thomas by Sir Martin Archer Shee and replaced it with a painting of a Welsh gardener by Albert Houthuesen. While Picton was labelled a hero after dying in battle at Waterloo, he had a controversial past as governor of Trinidad where his abuse of the population included torture. Two new artist commissions by the museum will re-examine the legacy of Sir Thomas.

See also
 List of national galleries

References

Further reading

External links

 

1907 establishments in Wales
Museums established in 1907
Museums in Cardiff
Art museums and galleries in Wales
National museums of Wales
Wales
Natural history museums in Wales
Organisations based in Wales with royal patronage
Grade I listed buildings in Cardiff
Archaeological museums in Wales
Decorative arts museums in Wales
Fossil museums
Musical instrument museums in the United Kingdom
Geology museums in Wales

Paleontology in the United Kingdom
Cathays Park
Arts in Cardiff
Domes